Sally Miller was an American slave.

Sally Miller may also refer to:

Other people
 Sally Perdue, aka Sally Miller, American beauty queen and radio talk show host

Fictional characters
 Sally Miller, a character from Frontier
 Sally Miller, a character from The Charmings American sitcom

See also
 Sally Miller Gearhart, openly lesbian American feminist